European route E 35 (E 35) is a north–south European route, running from Amsterdam in the Netherlands to Rome in Italy. In Germany, the highway runs from the Dutch border near Elten, through Oberhausen, Düsseldorf and Cologne to the Swiss border between Weil am Rhein and Basel.

Route description

North Rhine-Westphalia

Rhineland-Palatinate

Hesse

Baden-Württemberg

History

Exit list

See also

References

External links

035
G